Kareah or Careah (meaning in Hebrew "bald"), according to the Book of Jeremiah, was the father of Johanan and Jonathan, who for a time were loyal to Gedaliah, the Babylonian governor of Jerusalem.

References 

7th-century BCE Jews
Book of Jeremiah